Enrico Morello (born January 11, 1977, in Palermo) is an Italian former professional footballer

He played two seasons (18 games, no goals) in the Serie A for Parma F.C. and A.C.R. Messina.

He represented Italy at the 1993 FIFA U-17 World Championship

External links
 

1977 births
Living people
Italian footballers
Italy youth international footballers
Serie A players
Serie C players
Parma Calcio 1913 players
U.S. Pistoiese 1921 players
S.P.A.L. players
A.C. Reggiana 1919 players
A.C.R. Messina players
S.S.D. Lucchese 1905 players
Aurora Pro Patria 1919 players
Association football defenders
S.E.F. Torres 1903 players